A golden bull or chrysobull was a decree issued by Byzantine Emperors and monarchs in Europe during the Middle Ages and Renaissance.

Description 
A golden bull was a decree issued by Byzantine Emperors. It was later used by monarchs in Europe during the Middle Ages and Renaissance, most notably by the Holy Roman Emperors.

For nearly eight hundred years, they were issued unilaterally, without obligations on the part of the other party or parties. However, this eventually proved disadvantageous as the Byzantines sought to restrain the efforts of foreign powers to undermine the empire. During the 12th century, the Byzantines began to insert into golden bulls sworn statements of the obligations of their negotiating partners.

Etymology 
The term was originally coined for the golden seal (a bulla aurea), attached to the decree, but came to be applied to the entire decree. Such decrees were known as golden bulls in western Europe and chrysobullos logos, or chrysobulls, in the Byzantine Empire (χρυσός, chrysos, being Greek for gold).

Notable golden bulls 
Notable golden bulls included:

 The Golden Bull of 1082, issued by Alexios I Komnenos to grant Venice merchants with free trading rights, exempt from tax, throughout the Byzantine Empire in return for their defense of the Adriatic Sea against the Normans.
 The Golden Bull of 1136, issued by Pope Innocent II, more commonly known as the Bull of Gniezno.
 The Golden Bull of Sicily, issued in 1212 by Frederick II, Holy Roman Emperor.
 The Golden Bull of 1213, issued by Frederick II, Holy Roman Emperor.
 The Golden Bull of 1213, issued by the papacy to recognize its agreement with John Lackland (more commonly known as King John of England).
 The Golden Bull of 1214, issued by Frederick II, Holy Roman Emperor to cede all German territories north of the rivers Elbe and Elde to King Valdemar the Victorious of Denmark.
 The Golden Bull of Berne, supposedly issued by Frederick II in 1218, but now considered a forgery.
 The Golden Bull of 1222, issued by King Andrew II of Hungary to confirm the rights of nobility and forced on him in much the same way King John of England was made to sign Magna Carta.
 The Golden Bull of 1224 (the Goldener Freibrief) issued by Andrew to grant certain rights to the Saxon inhabitants of Transylvania.
 The Golden Bull of Rimini (1226), issued by Frederick II, Holy Roman Emperor.
 The Golden Bull of 1242 issued by King Béla IV to proclaim a free royal city for the inhabitants of Gradec (part of Zagreb) and Samobor in Croatia, during the Mongol invasion of Europe.
 The Golden Bull of 1267, issued by King Béla IV of Hungary.
 The Golden Bull of 1348, issued by King Charles I of Bohemia, later Holy Roman Emperor as Charles IV, to confer privileges and immunities on Charles University established by Pope Clement VI in Prague, one of the oldest universities in the world.
 The Golden Bull of 1356 (one of the most famous golden bulls), issued by Holy Roman Emperor Charles IV for promulgation at the Diet of Nuremberg, to define (and to last more than four hundred years) the constitutional structure of the Holy Roman Empire.
 The Golden Bull of 1702, issued by Leopold I, Holy Roman Emperor to establish the Akademia Leopoldina in the Silesian capital of Breslau (present name: Wrocław), the future University of Breslau (Universitas Vratislatensis).

See also
 Bulla (seal)
 Papal Bull

References

External links
 Andrew II of Hungary's Golden Bull of 1222
 Holy Roman Emperor Charles IV's Golden Bull of 1356
 Columbia Encyclopedia article on the Golden Bull
 Detailed Information about the Golden Bull
 

 
Seals (insignia)
Holy Roman Empire